Dexia albifrons may refer to:

 Dexia albifrons Stephens, 1829, a taxonomic synonym for the fly species Thelaira nigripes
 Dexia albifrons Walker, 1853, a taxonomic synonym for the fly species Ptilodexia rufipennis